Specs Howard School of Media Arts is a private for-profit career college in Southfield, Michigan. It is named after its founder Specs Howard and focuses on programs in radio and television broadcasting, graphic design, and digital media arts.

History

Specs Howard was born on April 8, 1926, in Kittanning, Pennsylvania. In 1948, he received a B.A. degree in history/political science and radio speech and dramatics from Allegheny College in Meadville, Pennsylvania. That same year, he opened his own radio station in Pennsylvania. Later, Howard moved to Cleveland and continued his broadcast career there. In 1962, he joined forces with Harry Martin, launching The Martin and Howard Show, which remained on the air in Cleveland until the duo moved to Detroit in January 1967. The show aired for another year in Detroit.

In 2009, the school changed its name to the "Specs Howard School of Media Arts" to reflect the broader scope of training offered. In 2021, Specs Howard formed a partnership with Lawrence Technological University and now holds its classes on the University's Southfield campus.

Notable alumni
 Jack O'Malley, politician and broadcaster
 Tony Ortiz, sportscaster and sports talk show host
 Gary Yourofsky, animal rights activist and lecturer

References

External links
Official website

1970 establishments in Michigan
Educational institutions established in 1970
Education in Michigan
Universities and colleges in Oakland County, Michigan
For-profit universities and colleges in the United States
Southfield, Michigan
Broadcasting schools
Digital media schools
Design schools in the United States
Art schools in the United States
Graphic design schools in the United States
Private universities and colleges in Michigan